Baron Grenfell, of Kilvey in the County of Glamorgan, is a title in the Peerage of the United Kingdom. It was created on 15 July 1902 for the military commander Sir Francis Grenfell. His eldest son, the second Baron, was Deputy Speaker of the House of Lords and Chairman of Committees from 1963 to 1976.  the title is held by the latter's son, the third Baron, who succeeded in 1976. He previously worked for the World Bank. Lord Grenfell lost his seat in the House of Lords after the passing of the House of Lords Act 1999. However, in 2000 he was made a life peer as Baron Grenfell of Kilvey, of Kilvey in the County of Swansea, and was able to return to the House of Lords.

Baron Grenfell (1902)
Francis Wallace Grenfell, 1st Baron Grenfell (1841–1925)
Pascoe Christian Victor Francis Grenfell, 2nd Baron Grenfell (1905–1976)
Julian Pascoe Francis St Leger Grenfell, 3rd Baron Grenfell (b. 1935)

The heir presumptive to the barony is the present holder's first cousin once removed, Richard Arthur St Leger Grenfell (b. 1966). He is the son of John St. Leger Grenfell (1940–1995), himself the second son of Major the Honourable Arthur Bernard John Grenfell (1908–1942), second son of the first Baron.
The heir presumptive's heir apparent is his son, James St. Leger Grenfell (b. 1996)

Male-line family tree

Sources

References

Baronies in the Peerage of the United Kingdom
Noble titles created in 1902